is a near-Earth asteroid that passed close by the Earth on 8 January 2019. It passed within 0.04 lunar distances or 15,000 kilometers of the center of the Earth, 8600 km from the surface. It was discovered by the Mt. Lemmon Survey 9 hours after closest approach.

, it is the closest approach of a non-impacting asteroid in 2019. 2019 MO impacted Earth on 22 June 2019.

See also 
 List of asteroid close approaches to Earth in 2019

References

External links 
 MPEC 2019-A128: 2019 AS5, Minor Planet Electronic Circular
 
 
 

Minor planet object articles (unnumbered)
Discoveries by MLS
20190108
20190108